António Luís Santos da Costa GCIH (born 17 July 1961) is a Portuguese lawyer and politician serving as the 119th and current prime minister of Portugal since 26 November 2015, presiding over the XXI (2015–2019), XXII (2019–2022) and XXIII Constitutional Governments (2022–present). Previously, he was the secretary of state for parliamentary affairs from 1995 to 1997, minister of parliamentary affairs from 1997 to 1999, minister of justice from 1999 to 2002, minister of internal administration from 2005 to 2007, and mayor of Lisbon from 2007 to 2015. He was elected as secretary general of the Socialist Party in September 2014.

Early life and education
Costa was born in 1961 in São Sebastião da Pedreira, Lisbon, the son of writer Orlando da Costa and journalist Maria Antónia Palla. Orlando da Costa was half Portuguese and half Goan Portuguese; his father was born in Maputo, Mozambique, to a Goan family. In Goa, Costa is affectionately known as Babush, a word in Konkani meaning a young loved one.

Costa graduated from the Faculty of Law of the University of Lisbon in the 1980s, when he first entered politics and was elected as a Socialist deputy to the municipal council. He completed the mandatory military service in 1987 and later practiced law briefly from 1988, before entering politics full-time.

Political career
Costa's first role in a Socialist government was as minister of parliamentary affairs under Prime Minister António Guterres between 1997 and 1999. He was Minister of Justice from 1999 to 2002.

Costa was a member of the European Parliament for the Socialist Party (PES), heading the list for the 2004 European elections after the dramatic death of top candidate António de Sousa Franco. On 20 July 2004 he was elected as one of the 14 vice-presidents of the European Parliament. He also served on the Committee on Civil Liberties, Justice and Home Affairs.

Costa resigned as an MEP on 11 March 2005 to become Minister of State and Internal Administration in the government of José Sócrates following the 2005 national elections.

Mayor of Lisbon
António Costa resigned all government offices in May 2007 to become his party's candidate for the municipality of Lisbon, Portugal's capital city. He was elected as Lisbon's mayor on 15 July 2007 and reelected in 2009 and 2013, with a bigger majority each time. In April 2015 he resigned his duties as a mayor, while he was already the secretary general of the Socialist Party and the party's candidate for Prime Minister, so that he could prepare his campaign for the October 2015 general elections.

Candidate for prime minister
In September 2014, the Socialist Party chose Costa as its candidate to be prime minister of Portugal in the 2015 national elections; in a ballot to select the party's candidate, gaining nearly 70 percent of the votes, he defeated party leader António José Seguro, who announced his resignation after the result. By April 2015, he stepped down as mayor to focus on his campaign.

During the campaign, Costa pledged to ease back on austerity and give more disposable income back to households. He proposed to boost incomes, hiring and growth in order to cut the budget deficits while scrapping austerity measures and cutting taxes for the middle and lower classes, asserting that would still allow deficits to reduce in line with the Euro convergence criteria. Also, he pledged to roll back a hugely unpopular hike in value added tax on restaurants and reinstate some benefits for civil servants.

Prime Minister of Portugal

On 4 October 2015, the conservative Portugal Ahead coalition that had ruled the country since 2011 came first in the elections winning 38.6% of the vote, while the Socialist Party (PS) came second with 32.3%. Passos Coelho was reappointed Prime Minister the following days, but António Costa formed an alliance with the other parties on the left (the Left Bloc, the Portuguese Communist Party and the Ecologist Party "The Greens"), which altogether constituted a majority in Parliament, and toppled the government on 10 November (the People–Animals–Nature party also voted in favour of the motion of rejection presented by the left alliance). After toppling the conservative government, Costa was chosen as the new prime minister of Portugal by President Cavaco Silva on 24 November and assumed office on 26 November.

By March 2017, polls put support for Costa's Socialists at 42 percent, up 10 points from their share of the vote in the 2015 election and close to a level that would give them a majority in parliament were the country to vote again. In the 2017 local elections, Costa further consolidated power in Portugal as his party captured a record haul of 158 town halls out of the country's 308 cities and towns; nationwide, the Socialists’ vote share topped 38 percent, again up from their result in the 2015 parliamentary election.

During his tenure, Portugal experienced its deadliest wildfires ever, firstly in Pedrogão Grande in June 2017 (65 dead) and later across the country in October 2017 (41 dead). In October 2017, the opposition People's Party (CDS) launched a motion of no-confidence in Costa's government over its failure to prevent the loss of human lives in the lethal Iberian wildfires, the second such disaster in four months; the motion was largely symbolic as the minority Socialist government continued to be backed in parliament by two left-wing parties.

In April 2018, Reuters reported that, "Since coming to power, Costa's government has managed to combine fiscal discipline with measures to support growth, while reversing most of the austerity policies imposed by the previous center-right administration during the 2010–13 debt crisis.

In early 2019, Costa's government survived another opposition motion of no confidence lodged over a wave of public sector strikes. Ahead of the 2019 national elections, Costa ruled out a coalition government with the hard left if, as expected, his governing party won the election but fell shy of a parliamentary majority. Instead, he indicated he favored a continuation of the current pact in parliament with the Communists and/or the Left Bloc – rather than any formal coalition in which they would have government ministers.

He was re-elected in the 2022 Portuguese legislative election, with the PS winning 120 seats, up from 108 seats, in a surprise outright majority in the Assembly. In the weeks leading up to the election, polling suggested that Costa and the Socialist party would retain their status as the largest party in the Assembly but would need the help of other parties to achieve a majority. In his victory speech, Costa thanked voters for giving him "an increased responsibility" and promising to govern "with and for all Portuguese". This gave him the mandate to form the XXIII Constitutional Government of Portugal.

Personal life
In 1987, Costa married Fernanda Maria Gonçalves Tadeu, a teacher. The couple have a son and a daughter. Costa also holds an Overseas Citizenship of India.

Costa is a supporter of S.L. Benfica, being a frequent spectator at their matches whilst Lisbon mayor, as opposed to Sporting's. He also accompanied Benfica to both UEFA Europa League finals, in 2013 and 2014.

Awards

Recognition

Civil awards and decorations
  Grand-Cross of the Order of Prince Henry, Portugal (1 March 2006)
  Grand-Cross of the Royal Norwegian Order of Merit, Norway (25 September 2009)
  Third Class of the Order of the Cross of Terra Mariana, Estonia (16 July 2010)
  Grand-Cross of the Order for Merits to Lithuania, Lithuania (16 July 2010)
  Grand-Cross of the Order of Merit, Chile (31 August 2010)
  Knight Grand Cross of the Order of St. Gregory the Great, Holy See (3 September 2010)
  Grand-Cross of the Order pro merito Melitensi, Sovereign Military Order of Malta (23 November 2010)
  Commander's Cross with Star of the Order of Polonia Restituta, Poland (18 July 2012)
  Commander of the Order of Rio Branco, Brazil (19 May 2014)
  Second Class (Grand-Cross) of the Order of the Sacred Treasure, Japan (16 February 2015)
  Commander's Cross with Star of the Order of Merit of the Republic of Poland, Poland (16 February 2015)
  Grand-Cross of the Order of Charles III, Spain (25 November 2016)
  Grand-Cross of the Order of Honour, Greece (21 April 2017)

References

External links

 Biography in the Portuguese Government site

1961 births
Government ministers of Portugal
Portuguese people of French descent
Living people
Mayors of Lisbon
MEPs for Portugal 2004–2009
Portuguese people of Goan descent
Portuguese politicians of Indian descent
Portuguese people of Mozambican descent
Portuguese agnostics
Prime Ministers of Portugal
Socialist Party (Portugal) MEPs
Socialist Party (Portugal) politicians
Recipients of the Order of the Cross of Terra Mariana, 3rd Class
Recipients of Pravasi Bharatiya Samman
António Costa